The 2021–22 Central Connecticut Blue Devils men's basketball team represented Central Connecticut State University during the 2021–22 NCAA Division I men's basketball season. The Blue Devils were led by first-year head coach Patrick Sellers, and played their home games at the William H. Detrick Gymnasium in New Britain, Connecticut as members of the Northeast Conference.

Previous season 

In a season limited due to the ongoing COVID-19 pandemic, the Blue Devils finished the 2020–21 season, 5–16, 5–13 in NEC play to finish in last place. They failed to qualify for the NEC tournament.

Roster

Schedule and results
NEC COVID-19 policy provided that if a team could not play a conference game due to COVID-19 issues within its program, the game would be declared a forfeit and the other team would receive a conference win. However, wins related to COVID-19 do not count pursuant to NCAA policy.
 
|- 
!colspan=12 style=| Regular season 
 
 
 
 
 
 
 
 
 
 

 
    
    
  
    
  
  
 
 
 
 
 

  
  

  

  
 
|-
!colspan=9 style=| NEC tournament

 

Source

References 

 

  

 

  

 

Central Connecticut Blue Devils men's basketball seasons 

Central Connecticut Blue Devils 

Central Connecticut Blue Devils men's basketball team 

Central Connecticut Blue Devils men's basketball team